The 1975 LPGA Tour was the 26th season since the LPGA Tour officially began in 1950. The season ran from January 31 to November 23. The season consisted of 27 official money events. Sandra Haynie and Carol Mann won the most tournaments, four each. Sandra Palmer led the money list with earnings of $76,374.

There were five first-time winners in 1975: Amy Alcott, Maria Astrologes, Susie McAllister, Mary Bea Porter, and Jo Ann Washam.

The tournament results and award winners are listed below.

Tournament results
The following table shows all the official money events for the 1975 season. "Date" is the ending date of the tournament. The numbers in parentheses after the winners' names are the number of wins they had on the tour up to and including that event. Majors are shown in bold.

LPGA Tour settles Jane Blalock lawsuit

 
The LPGA Tour dropped its appeal and made settlement in the lawsuit Jane Blalock filed against the Tour after they suspended her for one year due to cheating allegations that began at the 1972 Bluegrass Invitational where Blalock was disqualified. Blalock, with the help of a court order, was allowed to continue playing LPGA tournaments while her suit was  being resolved. In August 1974, a court had ruled in favor of Blalock and awarded her $4,500 in damages. Those damages were subsequently tripled in March 1975. The LPGA was also ordered to pay Blalock's legal fees, which totaled $95,303.

After settling with Blalock, the LPGA Tour adopted a formal organization which included having a commissioner.

Awards

References

External links
LPGA Tour official site
1975 season coverage at golfobserver.com

LPGA Tour seasons
LPGA Tour